Upper Benna Rural LLG is a local-level government (LLG) of Eastern Highlands Province, Papua New Guinea.

Wards
01. Rintebe
02. Mipo Klopabo / Nayufa - Nipuvo
03. Yatgu-Safa Megunagu
04. Benevenabo / Segerehei
05. Kogaru Megabo
06. Kuritafa/Megabo No. 2
07. Liorofa

References

Local-level governments of Eastern Highlands Province